Julie Dooling is a Republican member of the Montana House of Representatives who represents the 70th district. She assumed office on January 7, 2019, and her current term ends on January 1, 2023.

Dooling sponsored legislation known as the Montana Museums Act of 2020, which funded the restoration of several historical sites, museums, as well as the Montana Heritage Center. The bill was signed into law in December 2019.

References 

Living people
Republican Party members of the Montana House of Representatives
1971 births